Jindřich Barák (born October 2, 1991 in Prague) is a Czech professional ice hockey player. He played with HC Slavia Praha in the Czech Extraliga during the 2010–11 Czech Extraliga season.

References

External links

1991 births
Czech ice hockey defencemen
HC Slavia Praha players
Living people
Ice hockey people from Prague
HK 36 Skalica players
HC Stadion Litoměřice players
HC Berounští Medvědi players
Czech expatriate ice hockey players in Slovakia